The Public School Wanderers Club is a sports club in the United Kingdom that was formed in 1940 by Charles Burton, a Fleet Street journalist. It was formed to provide cricket and rugby for public schoolboys during their school holidays, but with difficulties arising from World War II the Club started to provide games for servicemen as well. During the period of hostilities the Club provided over a thousand games of cricket and rugby for servicemen from all parts of the British Commonwealth.

Founding principles

Ethos
After the war the Club became open, though still by invitation only; a player is invited to become a Wanderer because they are a credit to their sport (be it cricket or rugby) and will enter into the spirit of maintaining the high standards of play and conduct achieved by generations of preceding club members.

Colours, crest and motto
The club colours are red (representing the morning sky), green (for the playing field) and pink (of the setting sun).

The club crest contains five charges, a book (representing scholarship and the schools from which the original players were drawn), the lion of Cambridge University RFC, the crown of Oxford University RFC, the Rod of Asclepius representing the United Hospitals RFC and an escallop which has connotations of pilgrimage in heraldry.  There is also a Bishop's Mitre for the church affiliated public schools.

The club motto is In concordia floreamus which is Latin for In friendship we flourish.

Rugby

History
The rugby team play regional fixtures, celebration games, provide teams to play in developing rugby countries and engage in other rugby missionary activities.  They play the 15-a-side version of the game though it is in 7-a-side rugby tournaments that the Wanderers have made their reputation.  Since its inception over 2000 players have represented the Wanderers in over 5,000 matches.

The Wanderers have played "international" fixtures against Belgium, Germany, Netherlands, Italy, Kenya and New Zealand, they have also toured Bermuda, Canada, East Africa, South Africa, Uruguay, United States and most European countries.  They even took over the British Lions' cancelled fixtures in Zimbabwe in 1982.  They have been finalists on two occasions at the Middlesex Sevens, represented England at the Monte Carlo Sevens in 1987, 1988 and winning in 1989.  They were finalists at the 1988 Hong Kong Sevens and won the London Sevens as well as the 1996 Safari Sevens in Nairobi, Kenya.

A notable event in the history of the Wanderers occurred in the 1988 – 89 season when it fielded a team comprising 15 internationals against a Bath XV consisting of a full complement of Internationals also. Bath was the first non-invitation club to have been able to field a fully international side since Newport RFC did so in 1902.

The modern era has required the Wanderers to refocus their fixture list to reflect the realities of the modern professional rugby, taking into account the contractual obligations that players now have with their clubs.  Clubs still benefit from the more relaxed games that the Wanderers offer and to use them to test players returning from injury or to give younger players the opportunity to demonstrate their talents.

Nomadic by tradition, the club continues to play representative matches and to tour developing rugby countries, true to their roots – a combination of youth and experience.  Though the club has evolved to match the developments in the sport, they still measure their success not by victories but by its established tradition of playing entertaining rugby.  Any club wishing to invite the Wanderers to participate in a commemorative game or tournament either at home or abroad should contact the club via its website.

Matches, tours and tournament results

Seven-a-side tournaments

 Aberayron Sevens - Winners
 Amsterdam Sevens - Winners
 Bridgend Sevens - Winners
 Cheltenham Sevens - Winners
 Cwmtawe Sevens - Winners
 Glengarth Sevens - Winners (4 times)
 Hawick Centenary Sevens - Winners
 Harrogate Sevens - Winners
 Headingly Sevens - Winners
 Hong Kong Sevens - Finalists, 1985
 Kelso Sevens - Winners 1985, Runners up 1986
 London Sevens - Winners
 London Welsh Centenary Sevens - Winners
 Lords Taverners Sevens - Winners
 Melrose Sevens in 1975
 Middlesex Sevens - Finalists (twice), once on 27 April 1963
 Midland Sevens at Coventry – Winners 2001, beating Ebbw Vale RFC 16-6
 Monte Carlo Sevens - Winners
 Murrayfield Sevens - Winners
 Northern Sevens - Winners
 Oxford Sevens - Winners
 Punta Del Este Sevens tournament in Uruguay 1994 - Semi Finalists
 Safari Sevens - Winners (twice), Colin Charvis Captained the side and they won the tournament in 1996, won Plate 1997, won tournament 1999
 Scarborough Festival - Winners
 Selkirk Sevens - Winners 1972

Streatham sevens 1969 - Winners

Fifteen-a-side matches and tours

Cricket

References

English rugby union teams